Gottfried Ludolf Camphausen (10 January 1803 in Geilenkirchen – 3 December 1890 in Cologne) was a Prime Minister of Prussia.

Life 
During the Revolutions of 1848 in Germany, Ludolf Camphausen stepped suddenly from his banker's desk at Cologne to the presidential chair of the Ministry of State at Berlin, being called by King Frederick William IV of Prussia to succeed Count Arnim-Boitzenburg as prime minister, on 29 March. Ludolf availed himself largely of his younger brother's (Otto) proven business talents, and the two might have succeeded had they not to encounter the insincerity of the monarch on the one side, and the distrust of the Radical and Progressist majority of the Assembly on the other side.

Both Ludolf and Otto Camphausen were moderate Liberals – too Liberal to suit the views of the king and of the reactionary feudalist clique around him, and too Conservative for the impatience of the men
of progress. Less than three months sufficed to convince Ludolf Camphausen of this fact, and already on 20 June he tendered his resignation to the king.

One month later Camphausen was sent as Prussian representative to the Frankfurt Parliament. Here he remained until April 1849, when he finally resigned, and went back to his banking business at Cologne, thoroughly disenchanted of the alluring illusions of power and office.

References
G. L. M. Strauss, Men Who Have Made the New German Empire, Vol. II, London:  Tinsley Brothers, 1875, pp. 289–290.

1803 births
1890 deaths
People from Heinsberg (district)
Members of the Prussian House of Lords
People of the Revolutions of 1848
Member of the Prussian National Assembly